Nizhneye Mulebki (Dargwa: УбяхI Мулибкӏи) is a rural locality (selo) and the administrative centre of Nizhnemulebkinsky Selsoviet, Sergokalinsky District, Republic of Dagestan, Russia. The population was 442 as of 2010. There is one street.

Geography 
Nizhneye Mulebki is located 27 km southwest of Sergokala (the district's administrative centre) by road, near the Khabkay River. Khantskarkamakhi and Kardamakhi are the nearest rural localities.

Nationalities 
The majority of its population is Dargin.

References 

Rural localities in Sergokalinsky District